Chandler O’Dwyer (born 1 Mar 1999) is an English professional footballer who plays as an attacking midfielder for Richmond Kickers in USL League One. O’Dwyer played college soccer for University of Massachusetts Amherst as well as playing college soccer for CBU.

Career

Amateur and college 
O'Dwyer, born in Lingfield, Surrey, competed with Isthmian League side Three Bridges at youth and senior level.

In 2018, O'Dwyer moved to the United States to play college soccer at the University of Massachusetts Amherst. In two full seasons with the Minutemen, O'Dwyer made 22 appearances and tallied five assists. The 2020 season was cancelled due to the COVID-19 pandemic. For the 2020–21 season, O'Dwyer transferred to Christian Brothers University, where he scored 17 goals in 24 appearances for the Buccaneers, earning 2020 GSC All-Tournament Team honours and D2CCA First Team All-South Region in 2021, was voted the Gulf South Conference Offensive Player of the Year, as well as being named to the GSC Spring Academic Honor Roll.

While at college, O'Dwyer also competed in the USL League Two with Des Moines Menace, where he scored a single goal in 13 appearances across the regular season and playoffs.

Professional 
On 8 February 2022, O'Dwyer signed his first professional contract with USL League One side Richmond Kickers. He made his debut for Richmond on 2 July 2022, appearing as a 77th-minute substitute during a 4–1 win over North Carolina FC.

References

External links 
 Chandler O'Dwyer at UMass Athletics
 Chandler O'Dwyer at Christian Brothers Athletics

1999 births
Living people
English footballers
Association football midfielders
Isthmian League players
USL League One players
USL League Two players
Three Bridges F.C. players
Des Moines Menace players
Richmond Kickers players
English expatriate footballers
English expatriate sportspeople in the United States
Expatriate soccer players in the United States